On the Rock is the 20th studio album by Argentine singer-songwriter Andrés Calamaro, released on June 1, 2010.

Track listing

Bonus tracks

Digipack Deluxe 

The Digipack Deluxe includes:

Personnel 
 Andrés Calamaro – Lead vocals, guitars, keyboards.
 Julián Kanewsky – guitars.
 Diego García – guitars.
 Tito Dávila – guitars.
 Candy Caramelo – Bass.
 José "El Niño" Bruno – Drums.
 Andrés Calamaro, Guido Nisenson and Candy Caramelo – Producers.
 Guido Nisenson – Engineer.

Videoclips 
 Los Divinos
 Tres Marias (featuring Dante Spinetta, Emmanuel Horvilleur, Miranda!, Pablo Lescano, Vicentico, Zambayonny and Aníbal Fernández)

Charts

References 

2010 albums
Andrés Calamaro albums